San Pietro Martire may refer to:

St. Peter of Verona, an Italian saint
San Pietro Martire (Naples), a church in Naples
San Pietro Martire (Murano), a church in Murano